New Year Island may refer to:

 Año Nuevo Island, California
 Islas Año Nuevo, Argentina
 Isla de Año Nuevo, name variant of Isla Observatorio, Argentina
 New Year Island (Northern Territory)
 New Year Island (Western Australia)
 New Year Island (New Zealand)
 New Years Island, New York
 New Year Island (Tasmania)
 Mejit Island, Marshall Islands, called Neujahrsinsel by the German navigator Otto von Kotzebue in 1817